St. Mary's College is a school in Hambantota. It started as an English medium school in the Hambantota Church, Sri Lanka, on 23 January 1905. It currently consists of over 2000 students catering to the needs of children studying from primary to secondary level education by well experienced and qualified teachers numbering nearly 70 at present. St. Mary's College was named a national school on 15 March 1994.

History  
 St. Mary's School at Hambantota was started by Rev. Fr. Paul Coorman in 1903 adjoining the church property.
 Later he has purchased out of his own money two blocks of land and extended the school.
 This priest has later died of Cholera on 8 July 1919.
 After his death, Rev. Fr. G. Van Austin took over as principal.
 Later Rev. Fr. L. W. Wckramasighe took over the charge of the principal on 19th Nov 1919 and retired on 30th Aug 1931.
 During his time to complement the income to run the school, he bought out of his money 50 acres of paddy land at Goda-Koggala in 1940.
 As he found that the existing building was not enough he started to build a new hall for the English school towards end of 1951.
 However he could not complete the construction as he died on 31st Jan 1952. He had bought a good quantity of building materials and was able to do the foundation only but made provisions for the completion of the school hall.
 At his death he left a last will appointing the bishop of Galle as its executer.
 He was succeeded by Rev. Fr. Joseph de Silva on 23rd Feb 1952 as the parish priest of St Mary's church who completed the English school hall which was blessed by his lordship, Rt. Rev. Dr. N. M. Laudadio and declared open by Mr. Charlie Edirisooriya, Member of Parliament on 13th Jul 1953.

See also
 Hambantota District
 Education in Sri Lanka
 National school (Sri Lanka)

References

External links
  Facebook | St. Mary's College, Hambantota
 List of Educational Organizations applied for sch.lk domain names in Hambantota District (SchoolNet Sri Lanka)

National schools in Sri Lanka
Buildings and structures in Hambantota
Schools in Hambantota District